Amma Appa Chellam is a 2004 Indian Tamil language romantic drama film directed by Suryan. The film stars Bala, Chaya Singh, and Sathya, while Periyar Dasan, Sabitha Anand, Nizhalgal Ravi, Anjali Devi, T. P. Gajendran, Mayilsamy, Thyagu, and Vijay Krishnaraj playing supporting roles. It was released on 3 December 2004.

Plot
Chellam, who comes from a poor family, passes his plus two examination with distinction and gets the first rank in the district, making his parents Kannaiah and Velamma proud. The studious Chellam then joins a college in Chennai. His college mate Nanditha, who is from a wealthy family, befriends him and slowly falls in love with him. Chellam loves her too, but he refrains from revealing his feelings because improving his parents' life is his first priority in life. After finishing his studies, the skilled Chellam struggles to find a good job, and Nanditha wants him to show her his true feelings. However, Chellam makes it clear that his parents are much more important than anything else, thus breaking Nanditha's heart.

Chellam then decides to start a dairy farm, but he needs a bank loan to start his project. His cousin Kumar, who worked in Malaysia for many years, helps him get a bank loan. Chellam works hard and improves the living condition of his parents as he wished. When Chellam finally decides to reveal his love to Nanditha, she gets engaged to Kumar. Chellam, who is caught in a difficult situation, can neither reveal his love nor stop the wedding because of the respect he has for his cousin. On the eve of her wedding, Nanditha secretly meets Chellam and begs him to marry her, but he refuses. The day of the wedding, the heartbroken Nanditha tries to kill herself by jumping into a well, but Chellam saves her from drowning. Kumar learns about their love and supports it. The film ends with Chellam and Nanditha getting married.

Cast

Bala as Chellam
Chaya Singh as Nanditha
Sathya as Kumar
Periyar Dasan as Kannaiah, Chellam's father
Sabitha Anand as Velamma, Chellam's mother
Nizhalgal Ravi as Nanditha's father
Anjali Devi as Pushpa, Nanditha's mother
T. P. Gajendran as Kumar's father
Mayilsamy as Vinayagar
Thyagu as Pannaiyar
Vijay Krishnaraj as Govindaraj
Tharika as Divya
Megha as Akila
T. S. Muthu

Soundtrack

The film score and the soundtrack were composed by Bharadwaj. The soundtrack, released in 2004, features 5 tracks written by Arivumathi, Snehan and Vivekhananth.

Release
Cinesouth lauded the cinematography: "Each and every frame is noteworthy. The way to all the location have been filmed is simply superb" but criticized the film's screenplay and music.

References

External links

2004 films
2000s Tamil-language films
2004 romantic drama films
Indian romantic drama films
Films scored by Bharadwaj (composer)